Line 23 is an under construction Shanghai Metro line that would run from  in Xuhui District to  in Minhang District. Its It is planned to be  in length, and is planned to have 22 stations. The line was announced by the Shanghai municipal government in 2016. It will adopt unmanned driving (GoA4).

Once complete, it will feature interchange stations with Lines 3, 4, 5, 15, and 19. The construction period of this project is expected to be 74 months.

History

Stations

Service routes

References

Shanghai Metro lines
Proposed buildings and structures in Shanghai
Shanghai